Jean Cruveilhier  (9 February 1791 – 7 March 1874) was a French anatomist and pathologist.

Academic career 
Cruveilhier was born in Limoges, France.  As a student in Limoges, he planned to enter the priesthood. He later developed an interest in pathology, being influenced by Guillaume Dupuytren (1777-1835), a friend of Cruveilhier's father. In 1816 he earned his medical doctorate in Paris, where in 1825 he succeeded Pierre Augustin Béclard (1785–1825) as professor of anatomy. In 1836 he relinquished the chair of anatomy to Gilbert Breschet (1784–1845), and in doing so, became the first occupant of the recently founded chair of pathological anatomy.

In 1836 he was elected to the Académie de Médecine, becoming its president in 1839. For over forty years he was president of the Société anatomique. Puerto Rican pro-independence leader, surgeon and Légion d'honneur laureate, Ramón Emeterio Betances, was one of his prominent students.  He died, aged 83, in Sussac.

Contributions 
He was a highly influential anatomist, making important contributions in his study of the nervous system. Jean-Martin Charcot (1825-1893) credits Cruveilhier as being the first to describe lesions associated with what today is known as multiple sclerosis, of which were depicted in Cruveilhier's Anatomie pathologique du corps humain (two volumes 1829-1835, 1835-1842). Cruveilhier is also credited as being the first to provide a pathological account of the disease.

Cruveilhier was an opponent of large maternity hospitals, favoring home care as well as smaller hospitals with private rooms for women in labor. He performed extensive research involving the vascular system, being remembered for his studies of phlebitis, which he believed to "dominate all of pathology".

His name is associated with Cruveilhier's sign (persistent hypertension and occlusion of the portal vein) and Cruveilhier-Baumgarten disease (cirrhosis of the liver without ascites), a condition named with German pathologist Paul Clemens von Baumgarten (1848-1928). Cruveilhier's name is also associated with several parts of the anatomy; however, these terms have largely been replaced by the modern anatomical nomenclature:
 Cruveilhier's fossa: scaphoid fossa of sphenoid bone.
 Cruveilhier's fascia: superficial fascia of perineum.
 Cruveilhier's joint: median atlanto-axial joint.
 Cruveilhier's plexus: posterior cervical plexus, plexus formed by the dorsal rami of the first three spinal nerves.

Partial list of written works 
 Anatomie descriptive (1834–1836).
 Anatomie pathologique du corps humain (1829–1842), with over 200 copper plates illustrated by Antoine Chazal (1793–1854).
 Vie de Dupuytren (Life of Dupuytren, 1840), a book that was a memorial to his mentor.
 Traité d'anatomie pathologique génerale (1849–1864).
 Anatomie du système nerveux de l'homme (1845).
 Traité d'anatomie descriptive (1851).
 The Anatomy of the Human Body (1844), The First American Edition, From the Last Paris Edition, Edited by Granville Sharp Pattison, M.D., New York: Published by Harper & Brothers, No. 82 Cliff-Street (1844), Illustrated with numerous woodcuts from the best anatomical engravings.

See also
 Pathology
 List of pathologists

References 
 Jean Cruveilhier @ Who Named It

 Dr Léon Delhoume, L'École de Dupuytren – Jean Cruveilhier.  Paris  1937

External links 
  Outlines of the History of Medicine and the Medical Profession by Johann Hermann Baas and Henry Ebenezer Handerson

1791 births
1874 deaths
French pathologists
French anatomists
People from Limoges